Penalba or Peñalba may refer to 
Peñalba, a municipality in Spain
Peñalba de Ávila, a municipality in Spain
Palace of Cienfuegos de Peñalba in Spain
Santiago de Peñalba, a church in Spain
Cross of Peñalba, a 10th-century votive cross related to Santiago de Peñalba
Alicia Penalba (1918–1982), Argentine sculptor, tapestry designer, and weaver 
Borja Penalba (born 1975), Spanish composer, record producer, arranger and musician 
Gabriel Peñalba (born 1984), Argentine football midfielder
Gaby Peñalba, Spanish film editor